The five members of the National Transportation Safety Board each serve five-year terms after they are nominated by the president of the United States and confirmed by the United States Senate. One member is designated by the president to serve as chairman and another as vice chairman; each serves a two-year term in those capacities. The chairman is required to undergo a separate Senate confirmation hearing. When there is no designated chairman, the vice chairman serves as the acting chairman.

Members

Notes

References

External links